Cason is a surname. Notable people with the surname include:

Andre Cason, American sprinter
Antoine Cason, American football player
Aveion Cason, American football player
Barbara Cason, American actor
Buzz Cason, American rock singer
Chris Cason, American voice actor
James Cason, U.S. Foreign Service officer
Jim Cason (1927–2013), American football player
John L. Cason (1918–1961), American actor
Lino Cason, Italian soccer player
Rod Cason, American football player
Thomas J. Cason, American politician
Wendell Cason, American football player
William J. Cason (1924–2017), American politician
Yvette Cason, American actor